Daniel Gallagher may refer to:

 Daniel Gallagher (sheriff) (1896–1956), sheriff of the City and County of San Francisco
 Daniel J. Gallagher (1873–1953), American attorney and political figure in Massachusetts
 Daniel M. Gallagher (born 1972), Commissioner of the U.S. Securities and Exchange Commission